Dufouria is a genus of flies in the family Tachinidae.

Species
Dufouria americana (Reinhard, 1943)
Dufouria canescens Herting, 1981
Dufouria chalybeata (Meigen, 1824)
Dufouria nigrita (Fallén, 1810)
Dufouria nova Mesnil, 1968
Dufouria occlusa (Robineau-Desvoidy, 1863)

References

Dexiinae
Tachinidae genera
Diptera of North America
Diptera of Asia
Diptera of Europe
Taxa named by Jean-Baptiste Robineau-Desvoidy